is a former Japanese actress and voice actress. She is best known for starring as Fumiyo Nabekura in television series Guren Onna and voicing Agiri Goshiki in anime television series Kill Me Baby.

Career
Ai Takabe won the Gravure Award at the 10th Japan Bishōjo Contest in August 2004. The following month, she joined , an idol group composed of Japan Bishōjo Contest winners (8th through 10th). In May 2005, she won the Grand Prix award at the 1st Miss WPB Contest.

Takabe's first acting role was in the 2006 P&G Pantene Drama Special: True Love. She played a lacrosse player and acted alongside Yui Aragaki. She also played various minor roles in Gachi Baka, Teru Teru Ashita, Shimokita Sundays, and Kosodate no Tensai.

In October 2007, she played a supporting character in the television series Flight Panic. In 2008, Takabe played the leading role in Guren Onna, as a high school teacher who dresses up as the ghost of a murder victim.

Takabe was also affiliated with Oscar Promotion, until 2015.

Personal life
Takabe graduated from Horikoshi High School in 2007. In 2017, Takabe married a well-respected attorney.

Arrest
On October 15, 2015, Ai Takabe was arrested for alleged cocaine possession, effectively ending her acting career.

On March 30, 2016, the Tokyo District Public Prosecutors Office (PPO) dropped the charges against her. The PPO reported that the exoneration was not "due to a lack of evidence or condolence," but to a "comprehensive consideration of the very small amount of narcotics in her possession, as well as the social sanctions she has already received."

Filmography
Bold denotes leading roles.

Film
 Yoru no Picnic (2006) – Ryōko Uchibori
 Waruboro (2007) – Sayuki
 Gu-Gu Datte Neko de Aru (2008) – Kyoko
 Looking for Anne (2009)
 Liar Game: The Final Stage (2010)
 Joshikōsei Zombie (2010) – Airin
 Sue, Mai & Sawa: Righting the Girl Ship (2012) – Chigusa Maeda

Television
 True Love (2006) – Kana Suzuki
 Gachi Baka (2006) – Yūko Kageyama
 Teru Teru Ashita (2006) – Yoshiko Yamada
 Shimokita Sundays (2006) – Futaba Tadokoro
 Kosodate no Tensai (2007) – Miyū Kamiya
 Guren Onna (2008) – Fumiyo Nabekura
 Cat Street (2008) – Nako Sonoda
 Fukuoka Renai Hakusho Part 4 (2009) – Maya Ebihara
 Reset (2009) – Sachiko Akigusa
 Mirai wa Bokura no Te no Naka ni (2009) – Mika Higuchi
 Arienai! (2010) – Miwa Yamamoto
 The Legend of Yang Guifei (2010) – Yuriko Watanabe
 Freeter, Ie wo Kau (2010) – Michiru Toyonaka
 Ihin no Koe o Kiku Otoko 3  (2012) – Karin Sawaguchi
 Shirato Osamu no Jikenbo (2012) – Yumi Yanagisawa
 Yo Nimo Kimyō na Monogatari: Dressing Room (2012) – Maiko Kawai
 Renai Kentei (2012) – Kako Sekine
 Michinoku Mengui Kisha Miyazawa Kenichirō 2 (2013) – Umi Aoyama
 Tada's Do-It-All House (2013) – Saya Takeuchi
 Neo Ultra Q (2013) – Secretary
 Keishichō Minamidaira Han (2013) – Kyōko Shinjō
 Kakushōa (2013) – Sayaka Hiyama
 Depāto Shikake Hito! (2013) – Rina Hayama
 Sai Sōsa Keiji Yūsuke Kataoka (2014) – Minako Kurayoshi
 Black President (2014) – Misaki Tōyama
 Dekachō (2014) – Sakiko Inagaki
 Zeimu Chōsakan (2014) – Yū Tagami
 Yōjū Mameshiba Bōkyō Hen (2014)
 Hōigaku Kyōshitsu no Jiken File no Tōjō Jinbutsu (2014) – Chihiro Shimanuki
 Nishimura Kyōtarō Travel Mystery no Tōjō Jinbutsu (2015) – Miyuki Tsubaki
 Kyōto Ninjō Sōsa File (2015) – Kayo Hoshino
 Mito Kōmon Special (2015) – Okoi
 Konkatsu Keiji (2015) – Saori Shinohara

Anime 
 Aoi Hana (2009) – Fumi Manjoume
 Hourou Musuko (2011) – Maiko
 Sacred Seven (2011) 
 Kill Me Baby (2012) – Agiri Goshiki
 Kill Me Baby OVA (2013) – Agiri Goshiki

References

External links 
 

Japanese voice actresses
Japanese idols
Voice actors from Hachiōji, Tokyo
Voice actresses from Tokyo Metropolis
Living people
1988 births
Horikoshi High School alumni